The Marcus Nanotechnology Building (MNB) is a Georgia Institute of Technology facility. The building was constructed on the site of the Electronics Research Building, the former home of GTRI's Information and Communications Laboratory. It was opened on April 24, 2009, as the Marcus Nanotechnology Research Center, a name it held until October 2013.

Research
The Marcus Nanotechnology Building (MNB) is now the headquarters for the Institute of Electronics and Nanotechnology (IEN), one of Georgia Tech's several new Interdisciplinary Research Institutes (IRI). In addition to being the headquarters for the IEN, the building houses the largest cleanroom laboratory dedicated to the fabrication, characterization, and assembly of biomedical and semiconductor devices in the Southeast United States.

These shared-user open laboratories are part of the National Science Foundation's National Nanotechnology Infrastructure Network (NNIN), a network of 14 such facilities at universities around the US. The laboratories are available to global academics, industry and government personnel on a fee recovery basis enabling students, scientists and engineers who perform research on nanotechnology to study the characteristics and behavior of atoms and molecules, and to use that knowledge to create new materials and tiny nano-scale tools and machines.

Status
The Information and Communications Laboratory was previously located on the site, and has been moved to GCATT. The Electronics Research Building, established in 1966, was demolished, and construction began in Fall 2006/Spring 2007.

The construction was funded by several donations, including $7 million from the State of Georgia, $15 million from the Marcus Foundation, and $36 million from an anonymous source.

References

External links 

Georgia Tech buildings and structures
Leadership in Energy and Environmental Design certified buildings
University and college laboratories in the United States